The Fairfax County Public Schools system (FCPS) is a school division in the U.S. commonwealth of Virginia. It is a branch of the Fairfax County government which administers public schools in Fairfax County and the City of Fairfax. FCPS's headquarters is located in the Gatehouse Administration Center in Merrifield, an unincorporated section of the county near the city of Falls Church; the headquarters has a Falls Church address but is not within the city limits. 

With over 185,000 students enrolled, FCPS is the largest public school system in Virginia and one of the largest in the country. The school division has been led by Division Superintendent Dr. Michelle Reid since July 2022.

History

The public school system in Fairfax County was created after the Civil War with the adoption by Virginia of the Reconstruction-era state constitution in 1870, which provided for the first time that free public education was a constitutional right. The first superintendent of Schools for Fairfax County was Thomas M. Moore, who was sworn in on September 26, 1870.

At the time of its creation, the Fairfax County Public Schools system consisted of 41 schools, 28 white and 13 colored schools.

In 1886, Milton D. Hall was appointed superintendent. He would serve for 44 years until his retirement in 1929.

Fairfax County Schools, like most school systems in the south, schools practiced de jure segregation. There were local elementary schools for black students but no high schools. Although Fairfax was a densely populated area, there were proportionately few black high school students.  Fairfax, Prince William, Loudoun, Arlington and Fauquier Counties shared the high school for black students.  The school was centrally located between the counties in Manassas. Others attended high schools in Washington, D.C., where many had relatives. Those schools were Armstrong High School, Cardozo High School, Dunbar High School, and Phelps Vocational Center in Washington, D.C..  In 1951 Fairfax County, at the request of residents for a black high school, began construction of the Luther Jackson School. 
 The opening coincided with the Brown decision passed in 1954.

In 1954, FCPS had 42 elementary schools and 6 high schools. That year, the Luther Jackson High School, the first high school for black students, opened in Falls Church.

In 1961 FCPS began administering the schools in the City of Fairfax.

Massive resistance

The Supreme Court ruling in Brown v. Board of Education (1954) ordered an end to racial segregation. In response, the Commonwealth of Virginia immediately enacted legislation to stop the desegregation process, took control of all the schools in Virginia, and resorted to closing school systems attempting to desegregate. When Arlington County announced an early attempt at a desegregation plan, its school board was fired by the State Board of Education.  In 1955 the Fairfax County School Board renamed a "Committee on Desegregation" as the "Committee on Segregation" after a petition and threat of litigation from a civic group called "Virginia Citizens' Committee for Better Schools".

After the Brown v. Board of Education decision, Daniel Duke, author of Education Empire, wrote: "Whether local school systems such as Fairfax County, left to their own, would have moved forward to implement desegregation in the late fifties will never be known. Richmond removed any possibility of local option..." It was recognized in court cases that it was the state who was running the show, not the county. The ruling in a 1964 decision stated, "Prior to the Brown decision Fairfax County maintained a dual school system: one for Negro students; one for all other races. Shortly thereafter the placement of all children in the Fairfax County schools was taken from the local School Board and vested in the state Pupil Placement Board. The assignment of students remained with the state Board until the 1961–62 school year, at which time placement responsibilities were reinvested in the local School Board." Fairfax County began their desegregation efforts shortly thereafter.
 
As early as 1955, it was noted that in the Virginia General Assembly: Delegates from Northern Virginia openly opposed the Stanley Plans and called for even more radical legislation. Virginia's 10th district was the only congressional district to vote against the Gray Plan. Delegate Boatwright also introduced another bill aimed at correcting the unorthodox views of the northern Virginians. Boatwright's legislation would have prohibited certain federal employees from serving on school boards or holding other local offices. The point of this bill, called the "Boatwright Bill", was without a doubt aimed at Northern Virginia and the School Boards. Boatwright said his bill affected all Virginia communities but admitted Northern Virginia was most affected. The reason for the bill was that they felt that Federal Employees were in support of the Federal government's position on integration. The seven-member Fairfax County School Board included four Federal employees.

In Blackwell v. Fairfax County School Board (1960), black plaintiffs charged that the Fairfax grade-a-year plan was discriminatory and dilatory. Fifteen black children had been refused admission to white schools because they did not fall within the prescribed grades of the School Board's assignment plan. The plaintiffs contended successfully that the speed of desegregation was too slow under the school board's plan. District Judge Albert V. Bryan did not categorically rule out such plans in accepting the plaintiff's argument. Instead, he emphasized that they must be judged according to the community's character. Since the black school population of Fairfax County was less than four percent, Bryan considered the fear of racial friction an unacceptable justification for such a cautious desegregation plan.

The Civil Rights Commission report of 1962 found that "Every sign indicates that the communities in northern Virginia will be the first in the State to reach compliance with the mandate in the School Segregation Cases." Ultimately, Fairfax County was one of the first school systems in the country to be awarded funds to aid with desegregation because of their efforts to implement a desegregated system.

The Fairfax County School Board voted to switch from a 7–5 to a 6–2–4 grade level configuration in 1958, necessitating the creation of what were then called intermediate schools for students in grades 7 and 8. By the time the first eight intermediate schools opened in the Fall of 1960, they were already over their 1000 student capacities.

In the fall of 1960, the first black students were admitted to newly desegregated public schools. Jerald R. Betz and Raynard Wheeler were enrolled at the Belvedere Elementary School in Falls Church, and Gwendolyn Brooks was enrolled at Cedar Lane Elementary School in Vienna.

The changeover to the 6–2–4 plan was the last major initiative of Superintendent W. T. Woodson, who retired in 1961, having served 32 years, the second-longest tenure as head of the Fairfax County Public Schools system.

In April 1961, Wilmington, North Carolina Superintendent Earl C. Funderburk was appointed superintendent to replace Woodson.

Post-segregation

As early as 1965, Superintendent Funderburk was discussing plans to decentralize FCPS. By 1967, Funderburk had put together a plan for five area offices, each serving a portion of the county and had appointed Woodson High School Principal Robert E. Phipps and West Springfield High School Principal S. John Davis as his first two administrators that December.

Although the school board had endorsed Funderburk's plan, they also hired the consulting firm of Cresap, McCormick & Paget to conduct an audit of the system's management organization and operations. In 1968, based on their consultant's recommendations, the school board put a significantly modified version of the decentralization plan into effect, dividing FCPS into four areas which were, in effect, miniature school systems.

In January of the following year, Funderburk resigned, telling the school board he did not want a third term as superintendent. The school board selected Lawrence M. Watts from the Greece School District in Greece, New York to take the reins of the Fairfax County Public Schools system, which had grown during Funderburk's tenure from 65,000 to 122,000 students, in May 1969.

In May 1970, Watts appointed Taylor M. Williams as the first black high school principal since FCPS had desegregated, placing him in charge of James Madison High School in Vienna.

Watts' appointment of Williams would be one of his final official acts. After less than a year as superintendent, Watts died, aged 44, of a heart attack at his home in Oakton in June 1970. Assistant Superintendent S. Barry Morris was named interim superintendent while the school board sought a replacement to lead the 130,000 student school system.

The board did not have to look far for its new superintendent. In September 1970, Area Superintendent S. John Davis was chosen following a nationwide search to serve the remaining 33 months of Watts' four-year term.

During the mid-1970s, Davis had difficulties dealing with the start of a demographic crash and a population shift. The student population dropped from a high of 145,385 in the 1974–75 school year to an eventual low of 122,646 in 1982–83. Additionally, families migrated from established eastern and central parts of the county to newer developments in the west and south, leading to the unenviable task of Davis having to request the closings of some schools while needing to build entirely new ones elsewhere.

In a 6–5 vote, the school board voted in May 1976 to re-institute textbook rental fees, hoping to raise an additional $1.3 million to close a projected budget shortfall. The plan was scrapped two months later, in July, when the board was able to find a $1.4 million surplus.

In 1978, Fairfax County began countywide enforcement of its 15-year-old standardized six-point letter grading scale, with a ten-point spread at the bottom of the grading range. The grading scale, initially set in 1963, provided that a score of 100–94% was an A, 93–87% a B, 86–80% a C, and 70–79% a D, with any score below 70% an F.

The county school board adopted a $279 million budget in February 1979, which included a 5.15% cost of living raise for the system's teachers and other employees. However, this increase was only slightly more than half of the inflation rate, which was at an annual rate of 9.9% that month, and far short of the 9.4% increase FCPS employees had sought. In April 1979, the Fairfax Education Association, the professional association representing teachers in the county, adopted a work-to-the-rule action, which meant that teachers would not do any work outside of the 7.5 hours per day they were contracted for. Additionally, the FEA gave a vote of no confidence to Superintendent Davis.

The vote of no confidence was considered the main factor in Davis' decision to resign from Fairfax County Public Schools on May 18, 1979, and accept an appointment as Virginia Superintendent of Public Education from Governor John N. Dalton, despite having to take a $5,000 per year pay cut.

After Davis resigned, the Fairfax County School Board appointed Associate School Superintendent William J. Burkholder interim superintendent.

In November 1979, the school board named Orange County, Florida superintendent L. Linton Deck Jr. as superintendent following a four-month search. Deck had been a divisive figure during his 6 1/2 years in Orange County, with some residents glad to see him go, while others praised him as a strong and professional leader.

Deck inherited the problem of needing to close underutilized schools that had first plagued Superintendent Davis. 29 elementary schools, mostly in the eastern part of the county, were studied for possible closure, but Deck's recommendation in April 1980 was for eight schools to be closed, five more than the review panel had suggested. The following month, the school board voted to close seven of the eight schools at its May 22, 1980 meeting, a move which was met with angry hisses and boos from parents in attendance.

Fairfax County teachers' work to the rule action, which had begun in April 1979, was finally ended in May 1980.

Superintendent Linton Deck accepted a new four-year contract as Superintendent of Fairfax County Public Schools in January 1981. Shortly before accepting his new contract, Deck proposed making up a $2.75 million portion of his proposed $395 million 1982 school budget by instituting textbook rental fees for students. Although permitted by Virginia law, the plan, which included charging textbook fees from $22 for elementary school students up to $30 per year for high school students, was scrapped in the face of strong criticism.

Controversy over Deck's handling of an investigation of recruiting violations by the Mount Vernon High School athletic department, his censure by the Fairfax Education Association for a mishandled school closing, unhappiness with his leadership style, which was characterized as "aggressive" and "abrasive", and pressure from the Fairfax County Board of Supervisors angry at Deck's proposed budget led to the school board forcing Deck to resign on June 24, 1982, only  years into his four-year contract. The board appointed William J. Burkholder as acting superintendent.

At its April 25, 1991 meeting, the school board approved a plan where several intermediate schools in areas of the county with declining enrollments that had for the previous 31 years only served seventh and eighth grades would add sixth graders and become middle schools. Three intermediate schools, Glasgow, Holmes, and Poe, added sixth-grade classes.

In 1993, the four-year-old teacher merit pay was suspended due to budget cuts, and the school board voted to phase the program out completely over the next four years at its March 11 meeting.

From 1965 to 2006, the county school system was headquartered at 10700 Page Avenue in an unincorporated area of the county surrounded by the City of Fairfax. In 2006, FCPS moved all of its operations from the Burkholder Center and several other school-owned and leased offices to the office building on Gatehouse Road.

The school system has expanded to include over 196 schools and centers, including 22 high schools, 3 secondary schools, 23 middle schools, and 141 elementary schools. Fairfax County Public Schools (FCPS) also operates a fleet of over 1520 school buses, which transport 110,000 students daily. They operate on an operating budget of $2.5 billion through numerous funding sources. Today, FCPS is the largest school system in Virginia and the 10th largest in the United States. It also boasts an average on-time graduation rate of 91.5% and an average SAT score of 1213. The school district utilizes an electronic visitor management system to control visitors' access at its schools.

Special education

FCPS took over the education of students with mental disabilities from a parent-organized cooperative in 1953. The parents had begun the program in 1950, using whatever space could be found to educate their children, but eventually asked FCPS to take control of the program.

Special education classes for mentally disabled students were expanded in 1955 to four classes for "educable" (those with a mental age above 7) children at Groveton, Lincolnia, Oakton, and Luther Jackson schools, and a class for "trainable" (those with a mental age of less than ) children at Groveton.

Debate over grading policy

Fairfax County Public Schools was known for using a 6-point grading scale. Before May 7, 2009, 94–100% received an A, 90–93% was a B+, 84–89% was a B, and so on.

In 2008, a parent group raised concerns about whether the FCPS method of computing grades and applying weights for advanced courses adversely affected FCPS applicants for college admissions, honors program placements, and merit-based scholarship awards.

On January 2, 2009, Superintendent Jack D. Dale announced his decision on the issue, recommending changing the weights of advanced courses but maintaining the six-point grading scale.  Dale stated there was no conclusive evidence the six-point grading scale is disadvantageous for the students of FCPS.

Fairfax County Public Schools worked with the parent group to conduct a joint investigation into the issue. On January 22, 2009, the FCPS School Board directed Superintendent Dale to report to it with a new version of the grading scale by March 2009. The board also approved changing the weighting for Honors to 0.5 effective with the 2009–2010 school year and for AP and IB courses to 1.0 retroactively.

After investigation, the Fairfax County School Board approved a modified ten-point scale with pluses and minuses. The new scale went into effect at the beginning of the 2009–10 school year. 93–100% is an A, 90–92% is an A−, 87–89% is a B+, and so on.

Controversy over disciplinary policies

Fairfax County Public Schools' disciplinary policies for drug offenses came under community scrutiny in 2009 after two students committed suicide after being subject to school disciplinary proceedings. Both 17-year-old Josh Anderson of South Lakes High School, who died in 2009, and 15-year-old Nick Stuban of W.T. Woodson High School, who died in 2011, had been suspended from their schools for marijuana-related offenses. The school district also suspended at least one student for possession of her prescription medication.

Although then-Superintendent Jack D. Dale maintained that the disciplinary policy did not constitute "zero tolerance," the suicides nevertheless prompted the school board and the state legislature to revisit school disciplinary policies. After a year-long study, the school board voted to relax punishments for marijuana possession and add parental notification requirements for students facing serious disciplinary sanctions.

Organization 

FCPS is led by a superintendent and is overseen by a school board. The current superintendent is Dr. Michelle C. Reid, who began her term on July 1, 2022. Alongside Dr. Reid, FCPS is served by a Deputy Superintendent and Chief Operating Officer.

For FCPS administrative and governance purposes, Fairfax County is organized into five geographically-based regions (1 through 5). Each region is led by an assistant superintendent, who oversees operations at schools within the region. All five regional offices are directed by the Deputy Superintendent Dr. Frances Ivey.

School Board 

Virginia statutes and the Virginia Board of Education charge the Fairfax County School Board with setting general school policy and establishing guidelines that ensure proper administration and operation of FCPS.

The Fairfax County School Board comprises 12 elected members and one student representative. Nine elected members are chosen from each magisterial district (Braddock, Dranesville, Franconia, Hunter Mill, Mason, Mount Vernon, Providence, Springfield, and Sully). Three additional elected members are chosen "at-large". Members are elected for four-year terms. A student representative, selected for a one-year term by the Student Advisory Council, sits with the board at all public meetings and participates in discussions but does not vote. The board chair is elected to serve for a one-year term, and the current chair Rachna Sizemore Heizer (At-Large), has been serving since July 14, 2022.

The current members of the school board are Megan O. McLaughlin (Braddock), Elaine Tholen (Dranesville), Tamara Derenak Kaufax (Franconia), Melanie K. Meren (Hunter Mill), Ricardy J. Anderson (Mason), Karen Corbett Sanders (Mount Vernon), Karl Frisch (Providence), Laura Jane Cohen (Springfield), Stella Pekarsky (Sully). The other three members, Rachna Sizemore Heizer, Karen Keys-Gamarra, and Abrar Omeish, serve as "at-large" members. Michele Togbe from South County High School serves as the non-voting student representative.

Schools

High schools

 Annandale High School (Atoms) – Annandale
 Centreville High School (Wildcats) – Clifton
 Chantilly High School (Chargers) – Chantilly
 Thomas Alva Edison High School (Eagles) – Alexandria
 Fairfax High School (Lions) (formerly the Rebels) – Fairfax
 Falls Church High School (Jaguars) – Falls Church
 Herndon High School (Hornets) – Herndon
 Justice High School (Wolves) – Falls Church (formerly J.E.B. Stuart High School)
 Langley High School (Saxons) – McLean
 John R. Lewis High School (Lancers) – Springfield [formerly Robert E. Lee High School]
 James Madison High School (Warhawks) – Vienna
 George C. Marshall High School (Statesmen) – Falls Church
 McLean High School (Highlanders) – McLean
 Mount Vernon High School (Majors) – Alexandria
 Oakton High School (Cougars) – Vienna
 South County High School (Stallions) – Lorton
 South Lakes High School (Seahawks) – Reston
 Thomas Jefferson High School for Science and Technology (Colonials) – Alexandria
 West Potomac High School (Wolverines) – Alexandria
 West Springfield High School (Spartans) – Springfield
 Westfield High School (Bulldogs) – Chantilly
 W.T. Woodson High School (Cavaliers) – Fairfax

Secondary schools 
 Hayfield Secondary School (Hawks) – Alexandria
 Lake Braddock Secondary School (Bruins) – Burke
 Robinson Secondary School (Rams) – Fairfax

Alternative high schools 
 Bryant Alternative High School – Alexandria
 Fairfax County Adult High School – Fairfax
 Mountain View Alternative High School – Centreville

Middle schools 

 Carl Sandburg Middle School – Alexandria
 Edgar Allan Poe Middle School – Annandale
 Ellen Glasgow Middle School – Lincolnia
 Francis Scott Key Middle School – Springfield
 Franklin Middle School – Chantilly
 Henry Wadsworth Longfellow Middle School – Falls Church
 Herndon Middle School – Herndon
 James Fenimore Cooper Middle School – McLean
 Joyce Kilmer Middle School – Vienna
 Katherine Johnson Middle School (formerly Sidney Lanier Middle School) – Fairfax
 Langston Hughes Middle School – Reston
 Liberty Middle School – Clifton
 Luther Jackson Middle School – Falls Church
 Mark Twain Middle School – Alexandria
 Oliver Wendell Holmes Middle School – Alexandria
 Ormond Stone Middle School – Centreville
 Rachel Carson Middle School – Herndon
 Robert Frost Middle School – Fairfax
 Rocky Run Middle School – Chantilly
 South County Middle School – Lorton
 Thoreau Middle School – Vienna
 Walt Whitman Middle School – Alexandria
 Washington Irving Middle School – Springfield

Elementary schools 
There are 141 elementary schools in Fairfax County:

 Buzz Aldrin Elementary School – Reston
 Annandale Terrace Elementary School
 Louise Archer Elementary School – Vienna
 Armstrong Elementary School – Reston
 Bailey's Elementary School for the Arts and Sciences – Bailey's Crossroads
 Bailey's Upper Elementary School for the Arts and Sciences – Falls Church
 Beech Tree Elementary School – Falls Church
 Belle View Elementary School – Alexandria
 Belvedere Elementary School – Falls Church
 Bonnie Brae Elementary School – Fairfax
 Braddock Elementary School – Annandale
 Bren Mar Park Elementary School – Alexandria
 Brookfield Elementary School – Chantilly
 Bucknell Elementary School – Alexandria
 Bull Run Elementary School – Centreville
 Bush Hill Elementary School – Alexandria
 Camelot Elementary School – Annandale
 Cameron Elementary School – Alexandria
 Canterbury Woods Elementary School – Annandale
 Cardinal Forest Elementary School – West Springfield
 Centre Ridge Elementary School – Centreville
 Centreville Elementary School – Centreville
 Cherry Run Elementary School – Burke
 Chesterbrook Elementary School – McLean
 Churchill Road Elementary School – McLean
 Clearview Elementary School – Herndon
 Clermont Elementary School – Alexandria
 Coates Elementary School – Herndon
 Colin Powell Elementary School – Centreville
 Columbia Elementary School – Annandale
 Colvin Run Elementary School – Vienna
 Crestwood Elementary School – Springfield
 A. Scott Crossfield Elementary School – Herndon
 Cub Run Elementary School – Centreville
 Cunningham Park Elementary School – Vienna
 Daniels Run Elementary School – Fairfax
 Deer Park Elementary School – Centreville
 Dogwood Elementary School – Reston
 Dranesville Elementary School – Herndon
 Eagle View Elementary School – Fairfax
 Fairfax Villa Elementary School – Fairfax
 Fairhill Elementary School – Fairfax
 Fairview Elementary School – Fairfax Station
 Flint Hill Elementary School – Vienna
 Floris Elementary School – Herndon
 Forest Edge Elementary School – Reston
 Forestdale Elementary School – Springfield
 Forestville Elementary School – Great Falls
 Fort Belvoir Elementary School – Fort Belvoir
 Fort Hunt Elementary School – Alexandria
 Fox Mill Elementary School – Herndon
 Franconia Elementary School – Alexandria
 Franklin Sherman Elementary School – McLean
 Freedom Hill Elementary School – Vienna
 Garfield Elementary School – Springfield
 Glen Forest Elementary School – Falls Church
 Graham Road Elementary School – Falls Church
 Great Falls Elementary School – Great Falls
 Greenbriar East Elementary School – Chantilly
 Greenbriar West Elementary School – Chantilly
 Groveton Elementary School – Alexandria
 Gunston Elementary School – Lorton
 William Halley Elementary School – Fairfax Station
 Haycock Elementary School – Falls Church
 Hayfield Elementary School – Alexandria
 Herndon Elementary School – Herndon
 Hollin Meadows Elementary School – Alexandria
 Hunt Valley Elementary School – Springfield
 Hunters Woods Elementary School for the Arts and Sciences – Reston
 Hutchison Elementary School – Herndon
 Hybla Valley Elementary School – Alexandria
 Island Creek Elementary School – Alexandria
 Keene Mill Elementary School – West Springfield
 Kent Gardens Elementary School – McLean
 Kings Glen Elementary School – Springfield
 Kings Park Elementary School – Springfield
 Lake Anne Elementary School – Reston
 Anthony T. Lane Elementary School – Alexandria
 Laurel Hill Elementary School – Lorton
 Laurel Ridge Elementary School – Fairfax
 Lees Corner Elementary School – Fairfax
 Lemon Road Elementary School – Falls Church
 Little Run Elementary School – Fairfax
 London Towne Elementary School – Centreville
 Lorton Station Elementary School – Lorton
 Lynbrook Elementary School – Springfield
 Mantua Elementary School – Fairfax
 Marshall Road Elementary School – Vienna
 Mason Crest Elementary School – Annandale
 McNair Elementary School – Herndon
 Mosaic Elementary School – Fairfax (formerly Mosby Woods)
 Mount Eagle Elementary School – Alexandria
 Mount Vernon Woods Elementary School – Alexandria
 Navy Elementary School – Fairfax
 Newington Forest Elementary School – Springfield
 North Springfield Elementary School – North Springfield
 Oak Hill Elementary School – Herndon
 Oak View Elementary School – Fairfax
 Oakton Elementary School – Oakton
 Olde Creek Elementary School – Fairfax
 Orange Hunt Elementary School – Springfield
 Parklawn Elementary School – Alexandria
 Pine Spring Elementary School – Falls Church
 Poplar Tree Elementary School – Chantilly
 Providence Elementary School – Fairfax
 Ravensworth Elementary School – Springfield
 Riverside Elementary School – Alexandria
 Rolling Valley Elementary School – West Springfield
 Rose Hill Elementary School – Alexandria
 Sangster Elementary School – Springfield
 Saratoga Elementary School – Springfield
 Shrevewood Elementary School – Falls Church
 Silverbrook Elementary School – Fairfax Station
 Sleepy Hollow Elementary School – Falls Church
 Spring Hill Elementary School – McLean
 Springfield Estates Elementary School – Springfield
 Stenwood Elementary School – Vienna
 Stratford Landing Elementary School – Fort Hunt
 Sunrise Valley Elementary School – Reston
 Terra Centre Elementary School – Burke
 Terraset Elementary School – Reston
 Timber Lane Elementary School – Falls Church
 Union Mill Elementary School – Clifton
 Vienna Elementary School – Vienna
 Virginia Run Elementary School – Centreville
 Wakefield Forest Elementary School – Annandale
 Waples Mill Elementary School – Oakton
 Washington Mill Elementary School – Alexandria
 Waynewood Elementary School – Alexandria
 West Springfield Elementary School
 Westbriar Elementary School – Vienna
 Westgate Elementary School – Falls Church
 Westlawn Elementary School – Falls Church
 Weyanoke Elementary School – Alexandria
 White Oaks Elementary School – Burke
 Willow Springs Elementary School – Fairfax
 Wolftrap Elementary School – Vienna
 Woodburn Elementary School – Falls Church
 Woodlawn Elementary School – Alexandria
 Woodley Hills Elementary School – Alexandria

Special education centers 

 Burke School
 Camelot Center
 Cedar Lane School
 Davis Career Center
 Key Center
 Kilmer Center
 Mount Vernon Center
 Pulley Career Center
 Quander Road School

Interagency alternative schools 

 Adult Detention Center
 Boys Probation House
 Foundations (formerly Girls Probation House)
 GRANTS (GED Readiness and New Technology Skills)
 Gunston School at South County
 Hillwood School at East County
 Independent Study Program
 Merrifield Day
 Nontraditional Career Readiness Academy (NCRA): West Potomac, Edison, Spring Village, and Falls Church
 Sager School
 Shelter Care II (formerly Less Secure Shelter)
 Transition Support Resource Center (TSRC): Annandale, Bryant, Fairfax, Marshall HS, South County HS, South Lakes HS, Robinson SS, Westfield HS

Former schools 

Cedar Lane Elementary School
Clifton High School
 Clifton Elementary School 
Crouch School House
Dunn Loring Elementary School
Green Acres Elementary School (now owned by the City of Fairfax Parks & Recreation)
James Lee Elementary School (now the James Lee Community Center)
Lewinsville Elementary School
Pine Ridge Elementary School 
Walnut Hill Elementary School (now the Leis Center)
Westmore Elementary School

Schools for black children:
 Luther Jackson High School
 Cub Run Colored School
 Eleven Oaks Colored School (torn down, now the site of Eleven Oaks housing development)
 Fort Hunt High School

Transportation
FCPS operates a fleet of over 1,800 school buses. The fleet consists of buses that date from 2001 to 2018. FCPS operates the following bus models:

 2001 AmTran RE
 2001 Thomas Saf-T-Liner MVP EF
 2002 International RE
 2002 International FE
 2003 IC RE
 2003 IC FE
 2004 IC RE
 2004 IC FE
 2006 IC RE
 2006 IC FE
 2007 IC RE
 2007 IC FE
 2008 IC RE
 2008 IC FE
 2008 IC CE
 2009 IC CE
 2009 IC RE
 2010 IC CE
 2010 IC RE
 2011 IC CE
 2012 IC CE
 2013 IC CE
 2013 IC RE
 2015 IC CE
 2015 IC RE
 2016 IC CE
 2017 IC CE
 2018 IC CE
 2020 to 2030 Thomas Built Buses Unknown collaboration with Dominion Energy
Transportation is divided into several different offices. Area 1, Area 2, Area 3, and Area 4 are regional offices servicing different regions of the county. Area 1 serves the farthest south, Area 2 serves the central south, Area 3 serves the central north, and Area 4 serves the farthest northern region. A central office oversees all lower offices and a training center. The final office is Routing and Planning, which creates bus routes. Routing and Planning, also known as Area 7, maintains a fleet of vehicles. The white vans and cars from Area 7 transport special needs students to special public and private schools throughout the county.

Three garages service the buses: Alban, Newington, and West Ox.

See also

 List of Fairfax County Public Schools middle schools
 List of school divisions in Virginia

References
 Russell-Porte, Evelyn Darnell. "A HISTORY OF EDUCATION FOR BLACK STUDENTS IN FAIRFAX COUNTY PRIOR TO 1954" (Archive). Ph.D. Dissertation. Virginia Tech. July 19, 2000.

Notes

External links

 Fairfax County Public Schools
 Archives of fcps.k12.va.us

Education in Fairfax County, Virginia
Northern Virginia
1870 establishments in Virginia
Government in Fairfax County, Virginia
School districts established in 1870
Fairfax County, Virginia